The South African Bureau of Standards (SABS) is a South African statutory body that was established in terms of the Standards Act, 1945 (Act No. 24 of 1945)  and continues to operate in terms of the latest edition of the Standards Act, 2008 (Act No. 29 of 2008) as the national institution for the promotion and maintenance of standardization and quality in connection with commodities and the rendering of services.

Function

As the national standardization authority, the SABS is responsible for maintaining South Africa's database of more than 6,500 national standards, as well as developing new standards and revising, amending or withdrawing existing standards as required. 

The SABS plays a critical role in ensuring safety, quality, and reliability of products and services in South Africa, and in promoting international trade through compliance with global standards. 

Some of the key functions of the SABS include:

 Developing and promoting standards: The SABS develops and promotes national standards across various sectors, including agriculture, engineering, construction, and consumer products. These standards aim to ensure safety, quality, and reliability of products and services in the country.
 Testing and certification: The SABS provides testing and certification services to various industries to ensure compliance with national and international standards. This includes testing products and materials for safety and quality, and certifying companies and products that meet the required standards.
 Research and innovation: The SABS conducts research and innovation activities to support the development of new standards and to improve existing ones. This includes collaborating with industry, academia, and government to identify emerging trends and technologies that may impact standards.
 Training and capacity building: The SABS provides training and capacity building services to industry, government, and the public on the development, implementation, and compliance with standards. This includes providing training on standards development, quality management, and certification processes.

Internationally, SABS experts represent South Africa's interests in the development of international standards, through their engagement with bodies such as the International Organization for Standardization (ISO) and the International Electrotechnical Commission (IEC). SABS also holds the Secretariat for SADCSTAN, the standardization body for the Southern African Development Community of 14 nations.

SABS Commercial (Pty) Ltd, a self-financing division within the SABS, offers certification, testing, consignment inspection and other services, mostly to industry. Apart from offering systems certification and product testing against the requirements of South African National Standards (SANS), SABS Commercial also operates its proprietary product certification scheme – the SABS Mark of Approval, assuring buyers that products are safe, fit for purpose and offer redress.

Historically, the SABS also undertook certain regulatory functions on behalf of South Africa. In keeping with best international practice, this regulatory function was separated from the organization's standardization and certification activities, via the promulgation of the new Standards Act and the National Regulator for Compulsory Specifications Act in September 2008. Under these new laws, the former SABS Regulatory division separated to form the National Regulator for Compulsory Specifications (NRCS), a new organization also residing under the Department of Trade and Industry.

The SABS provides commercial services in seven industry clusters:

Chemicals
Electro-technical
Food & Health
Mechanical & Materials
Mining & Minerals
Services
Transportation

Headquartered in Groenkloof, Pretoria, the SABS also maintains offices in Durban, Cape Town, Port Elizabeth and East London, and operates specialised facilities at Richards Bay, Secunda, Middelburg and Saldanha.

Initiatives

South African initiative on reusable sanitary products 
Coordinated by the Department of Women, the Sanitary Dignity Framework was created to improve menstrual hygiene. It establishes a framework for a consistent approach to the provision of sanitary dignity in order to safeguard and restore the dignity of disadvantaged girls and women. The SABS intended to standardize the production of washable, reusable sanitary towels in August 2019. The standard was published on 6 May 2020 and is intended to help meet the diverse requirements of women and girls in South Africa who require safe menstrual management.

References

External links 
South African Bureau of Standards (Official Home Page)
SABS Standards Web Store

Standards organisations in South Africa
ISO member bodies